Fash Mosque, or Masjid Uhud is a small mosque beneath the Mount Uhud, under the cave, in Medina, Saudi Arabia. There are some accounts of the Islamic prophet Muhammad fulfilling the Zuhr prayer on the day of the Battle of Uhud after the battle. The construction is already destroyed and there are only few remnants of the east, west and south wall, and the mehrab mujawwaf which is still visible. The building is now surrounded by an iron fence to guard its sustainability. It is 4.5 km from Al-Masjid an-Nabawi.

See also

 List of mosques in Saudi Arabia
  Lists of mosques 
 List of mosques in Medina

References 

Mosques in Medina